The 1994 Cork Intermediate Hurling Championship was the 85th staging of the Cork Intermediate Hurling Championship since its establishment by the Cork County Board in 1909. The draw for the opening round fixtures took place on 12 December 1993. The championship began on 12 June 1994 and ended on 11 September 1994.

On 11 September 1994, St. Catherine's won the championship following a 3-12 to 2-11 defeat of Cloughduv in the final at Páirc Uí Chaoimh. This was their first ever championship title.

St. Catherines' Christy Clancy was the championship's top scorer with 2-34.

Team changes

From Championship

Promoted to the Cork Senior Hurling Championship
 Youghal

To Championship

Regraded from the Cork Senior Hurling Championship
 Valley Rovers

Promoted from the Cork Junior A Hurling Championship
 Blarney

Results

First round

Second round

Quarter-finals

Semi-finals

Final

Championship statistics

Top scorers

Overall

In a single game

References

Cork Intermediate Hurling Championship
Cork Intermediate Hurling Championship